The economy of Afghanistan is listed as 103rd in the world in terms of gross domestic product (GDP) based on purchasing power parity (PPP). With a population of nearly 40 million people, Afghanistan's GDP (PPP) stands at around $77 billion with an exchange rate of $20 billion (2020), and the GDP (PPP) per capita is about $2,000. Its total external debt is 1.4 billion as of 2022. The Afghan economy continues to improve due to the influx of expats, improvement of national infrastructure, establishment of more trade routes with neighboring and regional countries, and expansion of the nation's agriculture and mining sectors.

The billions of dollars in assistance that came from expats and the international community saw this increase when there was more political reliability after NATO became involved in Afghanistan. It currently imports around $5 billion worth of goods and exports over $1.8 billion worth of legal products, mainly fresh and dried fruits. It is predicted that the nation's annual export will reach $2 billion in the coming year.

Despite holding over one trillion dollars in proven untapped mineral deposits, Afghanistan remains one of the least developed countries in the world. Its unemployment rate is over 23% and about half of its population lives below the poverty line. The main factor behind all of this has been the continues war in Afghanistan, which not only deters major foreign investors and aid deliveries but also affects the health of the entire population. Afghanistan has long sought foreign investment in order to improve its economy. After NATO's withdrawal from Afghanistan, the Biden administration in the United States decided to confiscate or withhold Afghanistan's $9.5 billion worth of assets.

The national currency of Afghanistan is the afghani (AFN), which has an exchange rate of around 88 afghanis to 1 US dollar. The central bank of Afghanistan is Da Afghanistan Bank. A number of local banks operate in the country, including the Afghanistan International Bank, Azizi Bank, New Kabul Bank and Pashtany Bank. The use of foreign currencies is officially banned. The use of cryptocurrency is also banned by the government.

Economic history

When Afghanistan was ruled by Emir Abdur Rahman Khan (1880–1901) and his son Habibullah Khan (1901–1919), a great deal of commerce was controlled by the government. These monarchs were eager to develop the stature of government and the country's military capability, and so attempted to raise money by the imposition of state monopolies on the sale of commodities and high taxes. This slowed the long-term development of Afghanistan during that period. Western technologies and manufacturing methods were introduced at the command of the Afghan ruler, but in general only according to the logistical requirements of the growing army. An emphasis was placed on the manufacture of weapons and other military material. This process was in the hands of a small number of foreign experts invited to Kabul by the Afghan kings. Otherwise, it was not possible for non-Afghans, particularly westerners, to set up large-scale enterprises in Afghanistan during that period.

In the post-independence period, the Da Afghanistan Bank strongly financed the cultivation of cotton; at one point, the Spinzar Cotton Company in Kunduz Province was one of the largest providers of cotton in the world, most of which were exported to the Soviet Union. Fruits were mainly exported to British-controlled India.

The first prominent plan to develop Afghanistan's economy in modern times was the Helmand Valley Authority project of 1952, modeled on the Tennessee Valley Authority in the United States, which was expected to be of primary economic importance. Glenn Foster, an American contractor working in Afghanistan in the 1950s, stated this about the Afghan people:

Afghanistan began facing severe economic hardships during the 1979 Soviet invasion and ensuing civil war destroyed much of the country's limited infrastructure, and disrupted normal patterns of economic activity. Eventually, Afghanistan went from a traditional economy to a centrally planned economy up until 2002 when it was replaced by a free market economy. Gross domestic product has fallen substantially since the 1980s due to disruption of trade and transport as well as loss of labor and capital. Continuing internal strife severely hampered domestic efforts to rebuild the nation or provide ways for the international community to help.

According to the International Monetary Fund, the Afghan economy grew 20% in the fiscal year ending in March 2004, after expanding 30% in the previous 12 months. The growth was mainly attributed to international aid and to the end of droughts. Billions of dollars in international aid had entered Afghanistan from 2002 to 2021 but most of it was military aid. A GDP of $4 billion in fiscal year 2003 was recalculated by the IMF to $6.1 billion, after adding proceeds from opium production. Mean graduate pay was $0.56 per man-hour in 2010. The country expects to be self sufficient in wheat, rice, poultry and dairy production by 2026.

The recent reestablishment of the Taliban government led to temporary suspension of international development aid to Afghanistan. The World Bank and International Monetary Fund also halted payments during that period. In this regard, Taliban's spiritual leader Hibatullah Akhundzada stated, "The economy of a country is built when its people work together and do not rely on foreign aid[.]" The Biden administration froze about $9 billion in assets belonging to the Afghan central bank, which was intended to block the Taliban from accessing the money. The recent floods, earthquake and famine have created further adverse economic situation for many Afghans across the country.

Agriculture and livestock

Agriculture remains Afghanistan’s most important source of employment: 60-80 percent of Afghanistan’s population works in this sector, although it accounts for less than a third of GDP due to insufficient irrigation, drought, lack of market access, and other structural impediments. Most Afghan farmers are primarily subsistence farmers.

Afghanistan produced in 2018:

 3.6 million tons of wheat;
 984 thousand tons of grape (18th largest world producer);
 615 thousand tons of potato;
 591 thousand tons of vegetable;
 381 thousand tons of watermelon;
 352 thousand tons of rice;
 329 thousand tons of melon;
 217 thousand tons of apple;
 150 thousand tons of onion;
 106 thousand tons of maize;
 56 thousand tons of barley;
 47 thousand tons of peach;

In addition to smaller productions of other agricultural products.

Afghanistan currently produces roughly 1.5 million tons of fresh fruits annually, which could be increased significantly. It is known for producing some of the finest fruits, especially pomegranates and grapes as well as sweet melons and mulberries. Other fruits grown in the country are apples, apricots, cherries, figs, oranges, peaches, pears, and strawberries. The number of farms are steadily increasing. The growing of vegetables in greenhouses is also expanding in the country.

The northern and western Afghan provinces are long known for pistachio cultivation. In recent years, farmers in the southern provinces began growing American pistachio trees. Provinces in the east of the country, particularly Khost and Paktia, are famous for pine nuts. The northern and central provinces are also famous for almonds and walnuts. The Bamyan Province in central Afghanistan is known for growing superior quality potatoes, which produced 370,000 tons in 2020. Nangarhar, Kunar and Laghman are the only provinces in the country where large farms of oranges and lemons can be found. Nangarhar also has farms of olives, peanuts and dates. Cultivation of these products have spread to other provinces of the country. Some locals have recently planted a small number of banana trees in the provinces of Helmand and Balkh.

Wheat and cereal production is Afghanistan's traditional agricultural mainstay. The nation is nearing self-sufficiency in grain production. It requires an additional 1 to 3 million tons of wheat to become self-sufficient, which is predicted to be accomplished in the near future.

Livestock in Afghanistan mainly include cattle, sheep, and goats. Poultry farming is widespread in the warmer parts of the country.

Arable land in Afghanistan was reported to be over 7.5 million hectares. Wheat production had stood at about 5 million tonnes in 2015, nurseries held 119,000 hectares of land, and grape production is at 615,000 tonnes. It was reported in 2012 that almond production has jumped to 56,000 tons and cotton to 45,000 tonnes. About  of farm land in Afghanistan is used to cultivate saffron, including in the west, north and south of the country.

Forestry

According to a 2010 report, only about 2.1% (or 1,350,000 ha) of Afghanistan is forested. Some steps have been taken in recent years in planting trees in the urban areas across Afghanistan. Even the Taliban spiritual leader has recently called for planting more trees. Felling has been made illegal nationally.

Fishing

Afghanistan is landlocked with its citizens having no direct access to an ocean. The country has a number of reservoirs, lakes, ponds, rivers and streams, which make it a suitable climate for fish farming. Historically, fish constituted a smaller part of the Afghan diet because of the unavailability of modern fish farms. Fishing only took place in the lakes and rivers, particularly in the Amu, Helmand and Kabul rivers. Consumption of fish has increased sharply due to the establishment of many fish farms. There are over 2,600 of them in the country. The largest ones are at the national reservoirs, which supply fish eggs to smaller fish farms.

Trade and industry

Afghanistan's geographical location makes it economically secured. The Lapis Lazuli corridor connects Afghanistan with Turkmenistan and ultimately ends somewhere in Europe. Other such trade routes connect Afghanistan with neighboring Iran, Pakistan, Tajikistan and Uzbekistan. The country also has direct trade with China and India via air corridor. It has four international airports, which include: Kabul International Airport in the capital city; Mazar-e Sharif International Airport in the north of the country; Herat International Airport in the west; and the Ahmad Shah Baba International Airport in Kandahar. It also has over a dozen domestic airports all across the country. Ariana Afghan Airlines and Kam Air are currently the only airlines of Afghanistan. Its national rail network is slowly expanding to connect Central Asia with Pakistan and Iran. In addition to Central Asia, imported goods also come in trains from Iran.

The Afghanistan–Pakistan Transit Trade Agreement (APTTA) allows Afghan and Pakistani cargo trucks to transit goods within both nations. This revised US-sponsored APTTA agreement also allows Afghan trucks to transport exports to India via Pakistan up to the Wagah crossing point. There are over a dozen official border crossing points all around Afghanistan. They include Abu Nasar Port in Farah Province, Angur Ada in Paktika Province, Aqina in Faryab Province, Badinai in Zabul Province, Dand-aw-Patan in Paktia Province, Ghulam Khan in Khost Province, Hairatan in Balkh Province, Islam Qala in Herat Province, Sher Khan Bandar in Kunduz Province, Torghundi in Herat Province, Torkham border crossing in Nangarhar Province, Spin Boldak in Kandahar Province, Wakhjir in Wakhan, and Zaranj in Nimruz Province. The country also has legal access to two major seaports in Pakistan, the Gwadar Port in Balochistan and the Port Qasim in Sindh. Afghanistan also has legal access to two major seaports in Iran, which include the Bandar Abbas and the Chabahar Port in the south of the country.

Afghanistan is endowed with a wealth of natural resources, which include (among other things) extensive deposits of natural gas, petroleum, coal, marble, gold, copper, chromite, talc, barites, sulfur, lead, zinc, iron ore, salt, precious and semi-precious stones, and many rare earth elements. According to a 2007 assessment, Afghanistan has significant amounts of undiscovered non-fuel mineral resources. Geologists also found indications of abundant deposits of colored stones and gemstones, including emerald, ruby, sapphire, garnet, lapis lazuli, kunzite, spinel, tourmaline and peridot.

It is widely claimed that Afghanistan has at least $1 trillion in untapped mineral deposits. A memo from the Pentagon stated that Afghanistan could become the "Saudi Arabia of lithium". Some believe that the untapped minerals are worth up to $3 trillion. The Khanashin carbonatites in the Helmand Province of the country have an estimated 1 million metric tonnes of rare earth elements.

Afghanistan currently has a copper mining deal with China Metallurgical Group Corporation, which involves the investment of $2.8 billion by China and an annual income of about $400 million to the Afghan government. The country's Ainak copper mine, located in Logar Province, is one of the biggest in the world. It is estimated to hold at least 11 million tonnes or US$33 billion worth of copper.

The previous government has signed a 30-year contract with investment group Centar and its operating company, Afghan Gold and Minerals Co., to explore and develop a copper mining operation in Balkhab District in Sar-e Pol Province, including a gold mining operation in Badakhshan Province. The copper contract involved a $56 million investment and the gold contract a $22 million investment.

AFISCO, an Indian consortium of seven companies, led by the Steel Authority of India Limited (SAIL), and Canada's Kilo Goldmines Ltd are expected to jointly invest $14.6 billion in developing the Hajigak iron mine. The country also has a number of coal mines.

Afghanistan's important resource in the past has been natural gas, which was first tapped in 1967. During the 1980s, gas sales accounted for $300 million a year in export revenues (56% of the total). About 90% of these exports went to the Soviet Union to pay for imports and debts. However, during the withdrawal of Soviet troops in 1989, the natural gas fields were capped to prevent sabotage by criminals. Production of natural gas was restored during the Karzai administration in 2010.

The Afghan government and China National Petroleum Corporation (CNPC) had sign a contract in late 2011 for the development of three oil fields along the Amu River, in the northern provinces of Sar-e Pol, Jowzjan and Faryab. It was later reported that CNPC began extracting  of oil annually. In early 2023, the Xinjiang Central Asia Petroleum and Gas Company signed a similar contract with the Islamic Emirate of Afghanistan. Russia had also found interest in oil and gas supply to Afghanistan.

Economic development and recovery

Afghanistan embarked on a modest economic development program in the 1930s. The government founded banks; introduced paper money; established a university; expanded primary, secondary, and technical schools; and sent students abroad for education. In 1952 it created the Helmand Valley Authority to manage the economic development of the Helmand and Arghandab valleys through irrigation and land development, a scheme which remains one of the country's most important capital resources.

In 1956, the government promulgated the first in a long series of ambitious development plans. By the late 1970s, these had achieved only mixed results due to flaws in the planning process as well as inadequate funding and a shortage of the skilled managers and technicians needed for implementation.

Da Afghanistan Bank serves as the central bank of the nation. The "afghani" (AFN) is the national currency, which has an exchange rate of around 88 afghanis to 1 US dollar. There are over a dozen different banks operating in the country, including Afghanistan International Bank, Kabul Bank, Azizi Bank, Pashtany Bank, Standard Chartered Bank, and First Micro Finance Bank. Cash is still widely used for most transactions. A new law on private investment provides three to seven-year tax holidays to eligible companies and a four-year exemption from exports tariffs and duties. Improvements to the business-enabling environment have resulted in more than $1.5 billion in telecom investment and created more than 100,000 jobs since 2003.

Afghanistan is a member of World Trade Organization, SAARC, ECO, OIC, and has an observer status in the SCO. It seeks to complete the so-called New Silk Road trade project, which is aimed to connecting South Asia with Central Asia and the Middle East. This way Afghanistan will be able to collect large fees from trade passing through the country, including from the Trans-Afghanistan Pipeline. Foreign Minister Zalmai Rassoul has stated that the "goal is to achieve an Afghan economy whose growth is based on trade, private enterprise and investment". Experts believe that this will revolutionize the economy of the region.

Some of the ongoing national mega projects include the Qosh Tepa Canal project in the north of the country and the New Kabul City. Other smaller development projects include the Aino Mena in Kandahar and the Ghazi Amanullah Khan Town east of Jalalabad. Similar projects are also found in Herat in the west, Mazar-e-Sharif in the north, Khost in the east, and in other cities. These projects not only benefit many workers and factories in the country but also attract overseas wealthy Afghan investors.

There are as much as 5,000 factories in Afghanistan. Most are locally owned and operated, while a smaller portion involves foreign investors. They produce construction materials, furniture, household items, apparel, food, beverages, etc. The country imports roughly $500 million of textile goods from other countries. Afghan handwoven rugs are one of the most popular products for exportation. Other products include hand crafted antique replicas as well as leather and furs. Afghanistan is the third largest exporter of cashmere.

After the Islamic Emirate of Afghanistan returned to power, the country suffered from a major liquidity crisis and lack of banknotes. Because outside donors have severely cut funding to support Afghanistan's health, education, and other essential sectors, many Afghans lost their incomes. Under the assessment system of the World Food Programme (WFP), almost 20 million people suffered either level-3 “crisis” or level-4 “emergency” levels of food insecurity. The crisis’ impact on women and girls was especially severe. Officials under the new Islamic Emirate continue to provide communication services to areas that lacked them. The government collected 61 billion afghanis in tariffs between March and September 2022.

Tourism

Tourism in Afghanistan was at its peak in 1977. Many tourists from around the world came to visit Afghanistan, including from as far away as Europe and North America. All of that ended with the start of the April 1978 Saur Revolution. However, it is again gradually increasing despite having reputation as one of the most dangerous countries in the world. Each year about 20,000 foreign tourists visit Afghanistan. Tourists are advised to avoid areas where armed criminals are known to operate.

The city of Kabul has many guest houses and hotels, which include the Serena Hotel, the Hotel Inter-Continental Kabul, and the Safi Landmark Hotel. Small number of guest houses and hotels are also available in other cities such Kandahar, Herat, Mazar-i-Sharif, Jalalabad, Bamyan, Fayezabad, etc. There are bus terminals with mosques, Afghan style restaurants and small shops in the major cities.

The following are some of the notable places in Afghanistan that tourists visit:
Badakhshan Province
Fayzabad
Ishkashim (border crossing between Afghanistan and Tajikistan)
Wakhan National Park in Wakhan District
Balkh Province
Great Blue Mosque in Mazar-i-Sharif
Balkh (ancient town)
Hairatan (border crossing between Afghanistan and Uzbekistan)
Bamyan Province
Band-e Amir National Park
Site of Buddhas of Bamyan
Zuhak
Ghazni Province
Burial site of Al-Biruni
Burial site of Mahmud of Ghazni
Citadel of Ghazni
Herat Province
Great Mosque of Herat
Herat Citadel
Islam Qala (border crossing between Afghanistan and Iran)
Torghundi (border crossing between Afghanistan and Turkmenistan)
Salma Dam (Afghanistan-India Friendship Dam)
Kabul Province
Chihil Sutun
Darulaman (Darul Aman Palace, Tajbeg Palace, Afghan Parliament, National Museum of Afghanistan, etc.)
Gardens of Babur
Paghman
Qargha Reservoir
Shahr-e Naw (Kabul City Center, Serena Hotel, Abdul Rahman Mosque, Shahr-e Naw Park, foreign embassies, etc.)
Wazir Akbar Khan (Arg, Kabul International Airport, foreign embassies, etc.)
Kandahar Province
Aino Mina (modern community with hotels, guest houses, restaurants, shops, parks, etc.)
Dahla Dam in Shah Wali Kot District
Chilzina Park
Mausoleum of Mirwais Hotak
Reg District (Sand District)
Shrine of the Cloak
Shrine of Baba Wali in Arghandab
Nangarhar Province
Jalalabad
Ghazi Amanullah International Cricket Stadium (next to Ghazi Amanullah Khan Town)
Darunta Dam
Nimruz Province
Zaranj (border crossing between Afghanistan and Iran)
Kamal Khan Dam

National data
The following table shows the main economic indicators in 2002–2020 (with IMF staff estimates in 2021–2026). Inflation below 5% is in green. The annual unemployment rate is extracted from the World Bank, although the International Monetary Fund find them unreliable.

Gross national saving: 22.7% of GDP (2017)

GDP - composition by sector:
agriculture: 23% (2016)
industry: 21.1% (2016)
services: 55.9% (2016)
note: data excludes opium production

GDP - composition by end use:
household consumption: 81.6% (2016)
government consumption: 12% (2016)
investment in fixed capital: 17.2% (2016)
investment in inventories: 30% (2016)
exports of goods and services: 6.7% (2016)
imports of goods and services: -47.6% (2016)

Household income or consumption by percentage share:
lowest 10%: 3.8%
highest 10%: 24% (2008)

Agriculture - products: wheat, milk, grapes, vegetables, potatoes, watermelons, melons, rice, onions, apples

Industries: small-scale production of bricks, textiles, soap, furniture, shoes, fertilizer, apparel, food-products, non-alcoholic beverages, mineral water, cement; handwoven carpets; natural gas, coal, copper

Industrial production growth rate: -1.9% (2016)
country comparison to the world: 181

Labor force: 8.478 million (2017) 
country comparison to the world: 58

Labor force - by occupation: agriculture 44.3%, industry 18.1%, services 37.6% (2017)

Population below poverty line: 54.5% (2017)

Budget:
revenues: 2.276 billion (2017)
expenditures: 5.328 billion

Taxes and other revenues: 11.2% (of GDP) (2017)
country comparison to the world: 210

Exports: $1.48 billion (2020)
country comparison to the world: 164

Exports - commodities: gold, grapes, opium, fruits and nuts, insect resins, cotton, handwoven carpets, soapstone, scrap metal (2019)

Exports - partners: United Arab Emirates 45%, Pakistan 24%, India 22%, China 1% (2019)

Imports: $6.98 billion (2020)
country comparison to the world: 125

Imports - commodities: wheat flours, broadcasting equipment, refined petroleum, rolled tobacco, aircraft parts, synthetic fabrics (2019)

Imports - partners: United Arab Emirates 23%, Pakistan 17%, India 13%, China 9%, United States 9%, Uzbekistan 7%, Kazakhstan 6% (2019)

Reserves of foreign exchange and gold: $7.187 billion (2017)
country comparison to the world: 85

Current account balance: $1.014 billion (2017)
country comparison to the world: 49

Currency: Afghani (AFN)

Exchange rates: 88 afghanis to 1 US dollar

Fiscal year: 21 December - 20 December

Energy in Afghanistan

Energy in Afghanistan is provided by hydropower followed by fossil fuel and solar power. The nation currently generates over 600 megawatts (MW) of electricity from its several hydroelectric plants as well as using fossil fuel and solar panels. Over 670 MW more is imported from neighboring Iran, Tajikistan, Turkmenistan and Uzbekistan.

Price of electricity is 2.5 afghanis per kw in Kabul Province, 4 afghanis in Herat Province, and around 6 afghanis in Balkh Province. Many Afghans do not have access to 24-hour electricity. The government wants to use the nation's coal reserves to produce extra electricity. The CASA-1000 project will also add 300 MW of electricity to the national grid once it is completed.

Due to the large influx of expats from neighboring Pakistan and Iran, Afghanistan may require as much as 7,000 MW of electricity in the coming years. The Afghan National Development Strategy has identified renewable energy alternatives, such as wind and solar energy, as a high value power source to develop. As a result, a number of solar and wind farms have been established, with more currently under development.

See also

Afghanistan Accession to World Trade Organization

References

External links

 The World Bank In Afghanistan
 Asian Development Bank - Afghanistan and ADB
 FAO in Afghanistan
 Afghan Agriculture  (information resource site maintained by UC Davis and USDA)

 
World Trade Organization member economies